Matt Williams is an English rugby 7s international and player. He has played in the RFU Championship for London Scottish where he was a prolific try scorer, Moseley, Bristol Rugby  Sale Sharks and Doncaster Knights.

He attended The John Fisher School in Purley, Surrey; a senior all boys Roman Catholic day school.

References

External links
Stabunker profile

English rugby union players
Moseley Rugby Football Club players
Living people
Year of birth missing (living people)